KNDH is an American FM radio station licensed by the Federal Communications Commission (FCC) to broadcast on 96.7 MHz serving Carbondale, Colorado.

History
KNDH debuted as KUUR "Your Radio", serving the Aspen area with its translators including 101.1 (Aspen, Snowmass) and 107.7 (Glenwood Springs). Your Radio described its programming format as cool contemporary music. The station was founded by Marcos A. Rodriguez and owned by his Colorado Radio Marketing, LLC. Licensed to Carbondale, Colorado, the station was the first radio station in that area with the ability to do digital broadcasting. KUUR became the first American radio station to broadcast its programs in Bethlehem when, in December 2012, it was involved in a special arrangement with Radio Mawwal 101.7 FM there, which saw the broadcast of a section of KUUR's Christmas programming on that station throughout the Christmas season.

Effective July 22, 2021, Colorado Radio Marketing traded KUUR and its dependent translators to Colorado Public Radio in 2021 for KKPC (1230 AM) in Pueblo, which the network no longer needed. "Your Radio" was replaced with a simulcast of "Indie 102.3" KVOQ on May 26, and the call sign was changed to KNDH on May 27.

Translators
In addition to the main station, KNDH is relayed by several translators to widen its broadcast area.

See also
 KSNO
 TV Aspen

References

External links

NDH
Radio stations established in 2007
2007 establishments in Colorado
Adult album alternative radio stations in the United States
Colorado Public Radio